Akyaung Ari, or Ngachan, is a Tangkhulic language spoken in Burma. It is most closely related to Somra. It is spoken in Heinkut, Jagram, and Ngachan villages of Leshi Township, Sagaing Division, Myanmar.

References

Languages of Myanmar
Tangkhulic languages